The Arrábida Bridge is an arch bridge of reinforced concrete which carries six lanes of traffic over the Douro River, between Porto and Vila Nova de Gaia, in the Norte region of Portugal.

History

In March 1952, a preliminary project for a roadway bridge was adjudicated to Professor Edgar António Mesquita Cardoso, by the JAE. It was approved in 1955.

The construction of the bridge proceeded in May 1957. By decree 42/234, dated 22 April 1959, the Ministério das Obras Públicas (Public Works Ministry) promoted, through their respective City Councils, the construction of modest dwellings for the accommodation of families who needed to be demolished, as a result of the construction of access to the bridge. By 22 June 1963, the bridge was concluded and inaugurated.

In the 1990s, the elevators on the bridge were deactivated.

A process to classify the bridge began on 16 February 2011. An announcement was issued on 18 September 2012 (13409/2012) on the project to classify the bridge as a Monumento Nacional (National Monument), establishing its respective Special protection Zone.

On 24 June 2016, a tourist experience that allowed pedestrians to walk across the archway, an idea of Pedro Pardinhas, who invested 50,000 euros and safety equipment and transformation of a small annex as the reception hall for "Porto Bridge Climb".

Architecture

The bridge is isolated over the Douro river, supported over the northern margin along the Arrábida escarpment and along the southern margin at ravine in the area of Candal. It is implanted downstream from the D. Luís Bridge, and is the closest to the mouth of the Douro  River, establishing a connection between the IC1 (in Vila Nova de Gaia) and Porto beltway (VCI).

The structure is an iron, archway bridge, constructed of reinforced concrete, asphalt deck. The deck is supported by a dual archway, united by corner narrow elements in concrete crosses. There are 76 pillars, with the largest four located near the main supports, near the massive rectangular columns, with smaller pillars regularly spaced along the exterior surfaces. These larger columns have elevators that link the deck level to the marginal roadway along the Douro. The elevator volumes, facing the interior of the bridge, include addorsed sculptures. The deck includes six lines of traffic for vehicular traffic (part of the European route E01 system) and two narrower lines for pedestrian passage.

The cost of construction was 126 million escudos.

References

Notes

Sources

External links 

 Arrábida Bridge on bridge-info.org

Bridges over the Douro River
Bridges in Porto
Bridges completed in 1963
Deck arch bridges
Concrete bridges
National monuments in Porto District
Listed bridges in Portugal